Wild Bill Elliott (born Gordon Nance, October 16, 1904 – November 26, 1965) was an American film actor. He specialized in playing the rugged heroes of B Westerns, particularly the Red Ryder series of films.

Early life
Elliott was born Gordon Nance on a ranch near Pattonsburg, Missouri, the son of Leroy Whitfield Nance, a cattle broker, and his wife, Maude Myrtle Auldridge.

The young Nance grew up within 20 miles of his birthplace; he spent most of his youth on a ranch near King City, Missouri. His father was a cattle rancher and commissioner buyer for the Kansas City stockyards. Riding and roping were part of Nance's upbringing. He won first place in a rodeo event in the 1920 American Royal livestock show. He briefly attended Rockhurst College, a Jesuit school in Kansas City, but soon left for California with hopes of becoming an actor.

Career

By 1925, he was getting occasional extra work in films.  He took classes at the Pasadena Playhouse and appeared in a few stage roles there.  By 1927, he had made his first Western, The Arizona Wildcat, playing his first featured role.  Several co-starring roles followed, and he renamed himself Gordon Elliott, but as the studios made the transition to sound films, he slipped back into roles as an extra and bit parts, as in Broadway Scandals, in 1929.  For the next eight years, he appeared in over 100 films for various studios, but almost always in unbilled parts as an extra.

Elliott began to be noticed in some minor B Westerns, enough so that Columbia Pictures offered him the title role in a serial, The Great Adventures of Wild Bill Hickok (1938). The serial was so successful, and Elliott so personable, that Columbia promoted him to starring in his own series of Western features, replacing Columbia's number-two cowboy star, Robert "Tex" Allen. Henceforth, Gordon Elliott was known as Bill Elliott. Within two years, he was among the Motion Picture Heralds top-10 Western stars, where he would remain for the next 15 years.

In 1943, Elliott signed with Republic Pictures, which cast him in a series of Westerns alongside George "Gabby" Hayes. The first of these, Calling Wild Bill Elliott, gave Elliott the name by which he would be best known and by which he would be billed almost exclusively for the rest of his career.

Following several films in which both actor and character shared the name Wild Bill Elliott, he took the role for which he would be best remembered, that of Red Ryder in a series of 16 movies about the famous comic-strip cowboy and his young Indian companion, Little Beaver (played in Elliott's films by Bobby Blake). Elliott played the role for only two years but would forever be associated with it. Elliott's trademark was a pair of six guns worn butt-forward in their holsters.

Elliott's career thrived during and after the Red Ryder films, and he continued making B Westerns into the early 1950s.  He also had his own radio show during the late 1940s. 

In an interview with Ben Johnson and Harry Carey Jr., Ben recalls teaching many actors to ride a horse, including Bill. Bill didn't just learn to ride a horse but asked Ben many questions about style and technique. According to Ben, Bill become a very good horseman in his own right while the others "looked like a sack of walnuts on a horse."

His final contract as a Western star was with Monogram Pictures, where budgets declined as the B Western lost its audience to television. When Monogram became Allied Artists Pictures Corporation in 1953, it phased out its Western productions, and Elliott finished out his contract playing a homicide detective in a series of five modern police dramas, his first non-Westerns since 1938.

Elliott retired from films (except for a few TV Western pilots, which were not picked up). He worked for a time as a spokesman for Viceroy cigarettes and hosted a local TV program in Las Vegas, Nevada, which featured many of his Western films.

Personal life and death
Elliott married Helen Josephine Meyers in February 1927. Their daughter, Barbara Helen Nance, was born October 14, 1927. Elliott and his wife were divorced in 1961. He married Dolly Moore that same year. Following his retirement in 1957, he moved from Los Angeles to Las Vegas, Nevada, where he bought a ranch. He died there from lung cancer on November 26, 1965, aged 61. He is interred at Palm Downtown Mortuary/Cemetery in Las Vegas.

Partial filmography 
(His 3 serials and 16 Red Ryder films are noted below)

 The Plastic Age (1925) (uncredited)
 The Shamrock Handicap (1926) (uncredited)
 Beyond London Lights (1928)
 Restless Youth (1928)
 The Passion Song (1928)
 Smart Woman (1931) (uncredited)
 Consolation Marriage (1931) (uncredited)
 Left Over Ladies (1931)
 The Final Edition (1932)
 Cocktail Hour (1933) (uncredited)
 The Goose and the Gander (1935)
 Moonlight on the Prairie (1935)
 Trailin' West (1936)
 Boots and Saddles (1937) as Neil
 Wife, Doctor and Nurse (1937)
 The Lady in the Morgue (1938)
 The Great Adventures of Wild Bill Hickok (1938)  Serial In Early Arizona (1938)
 Frontiers of '49 (1939)
 Lone Star Pioneers (1939)
 The Law Comes to Texas (1939)
 Overland with Kit Carson (1939)  Serial The Taming of the West (1939)
 Pioneers of the Frontier (1940)
 The Man from Tumbleweeds (1940)
 The Return of Wild Bill (1940)
 Prairie Schooners (1940)
 Beyond the Sacramento (1940)
 The Wildcat of Tucson (1940)
 Across the Sierras (1941)
 North from the Lone Star (1941)
 The Return of Daniel Boone (1941)
 Hands Across the Rockies (1941)
 The Son of Davy Crockett (1941)
 King of Dodge City (1941)
 Roaring Frontiers (1941)
 The Lone Star Vigilantes (1942)
 Bullets for Bandits (1942)
 North of the Rockies (1942)
 The Devil's Trail (1942)
 Prairie Gunsmoke (1942)
 Vengeance of the West (1942)
 The Valley of Vanishing Men (1942)  Serial''' Calling Wild Bill Elliott (1943)
 The Man from Thunder River (1943)
 Wagon Tracks West (1943)
 Tucson Raiders (1944) featuring Red Ryder
 Marshal of Reno (1944) featuring Red Ryder
 The San Antonio Kid (1944) featuring Red Ryder
 Cheyenne Wildcat (1944) featuring Red Ryder
 Vigilantes of Dodge City (1944) featuring Red Ryder
 Sheriff of Las Vegas (1944) featuring Red Ryder
 Great Stagecoach Robbery (1945) featuring Red Ryder
 Lone Texas Ranger (1945) featuring Red Ryder
 Phantom of the Plains (1945) featuring Red Ryder
 Marshal of Laredo (1945) featuring Red Ryder
 Colorado Pioneers (1945) featuring Red Ryder
 Wagon Wheels Westward (1945) featuring Red Ryder
 California Gold Rush (1946) featuring Red Ryder
 Sheriff of Redwood Valley (1946) featuring Red Ryder
 Sun Valley Cyclone (1946) featuring Red Ryder
 Conquest of Cheyenne (1946) featuring Red Ryder
 Plainsman and the Lady (1946)
 Wyoming (1947)
 The Fabulous Texan (1947)
 Old Los Angeles (1948)
 The Gallant Legion (1948)
 Hellfire (1949)
 The Last Bandit (1949)
 The Savage Horde (1950)
 The Showdown (1950)
 The Longhorn (1951)
 Fargo (1952)
 Waco (1952)
 Kansas Territory (1952)
 The Maverick (1952)
 The Homesteaders (1953)
 Rebel City (1953)
 Topeka (1953)
 The Forty-Niners (1954)
 Dial Red O (1955)
 Sudden Danger (1955)
 Calling Homicide (1956)
 Chain of Evidence (1957)
 Footsteps in the Night'' (1957)

References

External links

1904 births
1965 deaths
American male film actors
Deaths from cancer in Nevada
Deaths from lung cancer
Male actors from Missouri
Male Western (genre) film actors
20th-century American male actors
People from Daviess County, Missouri
People from King City, Missouri